The 1981 Colorado State Rams football team was an American football team that represented Colorado State University in the Western Athletic Conference (WAC) during the 1981 NCAA Division I-A football season. The team compiled a 0–12 record (0–8 against WAC opponents).

Head coach Sark Arslanian was fired after the Rams opened the season with a 0–6 record, ending his nine-year tenure with a 46–46–4 record. Defensive coordinator Chester Caddas was named as the team's interim head coach and led the team to an 0–6 record, finishing the season winless. Caddas was replaced by Texas defensive coordinator Leon Fuller after the 1981 season.

Schedule

References

Colorado State
Colorado State Rams football seasons
College football winless seasons
Colorado State Rams football